The mixed doubles tournament at the 1986 French Open was held from 26 May until 8 June 1986 on the outdoor clay courts at the Stade Roland Garros in Paris, France. Kathy Jordan and Ken Flach won the title, defeating Rosalyn Fairbank and Mark Edmondson in the final.

Draw

Finals

Top half

Section 1

Section 2

Bottom half

Section 3

Section 4

External links
1986 French Open – Doubles draws and results at the International Tennis Federation

Mixed Doubles
French Open by year – Mixed doubles